Śródmieście (means "city centre") is a district (dzielnica) of the city of Gdańsk, Poland. Śródmieście is commonly referred to as Main City, Old City, or simply Gdańsk, since the quarter is equivalent to the traditional area of the city.

Location
The quarter is located in the centre-eastern part of Gdańsk, on the River Motława to its west and east. To its north-east, the quarter borders the Przeróbka quarter on Port Island by the Martwa Wisła River. To its south and east, the quarter is bordered by the Opływ Motławy, via which the quarter borders the quarters of Rudniki, Olszynka and Orunia-Św. Wojciech-Lipce. To the south-west of Śródmieście, via Biskupia Górka, the quarter borders Chełm, to the west with Siedlce. Śródmieście borders Aniołki and Młyniska to its north.

Quarter subdivisions

The following morphological units are located in Śródmieście:

Transport
The Gdańsk Główny and Gdańsk Śródmieście railway stations are located within the district, with the former being the second busiest railway station in the Tricity and ninth busiest station in Poland (as of 2021).

External links

 Map of Śródmieście

References 

Districts of Gdańsk